The Bârghiș (also: Pelișor) is a right tributary of the river Hârtibaciu in Romania. It flows into the Hârtibaciu west of Agnita.

References

Rivers of Romania
Rivers of Sibiu County